Leisure Seizure is the second studio album by rock artist Tom Vek. It was released in 2011 on Island Records. The first single "A Chore" was released on 18 April 2011.

Track listing

2011 albums
Tom Vek albums